God Is a Bullet is an upcoming American crime horror-thriller film written and directed by Nick Cassavetes and starring Jamie Foxx, Nikolaj Coster-Waldau, Maika Monroe, January Jones and Andrew Dice Clay.  It is based on the novel of the same name by Boston Teran.  Sidney Kimmel serves as an executive producer of the film.

Cast
Jamie Foxx as The Ferryman
Nikolaj Coster-Waldau as Bob Hightower
January Jones
Maika Monroe as Case Hardin
Andrew Dice Clay
Karl Glusman
David Thornton
Paul Johansson
Jonathan Tucker
Ethan Suplee
Garrett Wareing
Brendan Sexton III
Virginia Cassavetes
Chloe Guy

Production
Filming occurred in Mexico City in May 2021.  Filming wrapped in New Mexico in August 2021.

References

External links
 

American crime thriller films
Upcoming films
Films shot in New Mexico
Films shot in Mexico City
Films based on American novels
Films directed by Nick Cassavetes